Gravitas was one of the ancient Roman virtues that denoted "seriousness". It is also translated variously as weight, dignity, and importance and connotes restraint and moral rigor. It also conveys a sense of responsibility and commitment to the task.

Along with pietas (regard for discipline and authority), severitas, gloria, simplicitas (lucidity), integritas, dignitas, and virtus, gravitas was particularly appreciated as an ideal characteristic in leaders. Gravitas and virtus are considered more canonical virtues than the others.

Roman concept 

Gravitas was one of the virtues that allowed citizens, particularly statesmen, to embody the concept of romanitas, which denotes what it meant to be Roman and how Romans regarded themselves, eventually evolving into a national character. Many Roman philosophers praised constantia (perseverance, endurance, and courage), dignitas and gravitas as the most important virtues; this is because it made dignified men capable. These are additional concepts that accompany Roman actions. The men of the ruling upper and upper-middle classes were educated in a public school system where Classical language and literature formed basic elements of the curriculum.

Particularly, exuding gravitas or dignified and serious conduct allowed Romans to maintain a persistent element of conservatism and traditionalism. According to the Roman emperor and philosopher Marcus Aurelius, the cultivation of gravitas involves acting with sincerity and dignity and this is said to be achieved by being temperate in manner and speech as well as by carrying oneself with authority.
Other sources also associate it with living an austere lifestyle and it was one of the moral bases of the sanctioned control exercised by the Roman censores (see Roman Censors). An account described how old statesmen who realized that they no longer meet the standards of romanitas for failing to perform their public function with dignity and gravitas committed suicide or simply refused taking food. This concerned how the Romans defined themselves and their honor.

During Augustus' regime, gravitas was not included in the four cardinal virtues (virtus, clementia, justitia, and pietas) that were introduced to establish the myth of the Roman emperor and the model of a good ruler.

Greek presence

Aristotle identified three essentials of persuasive communication—a big component of personal presence:

Logical argument (the ability to articulate your points clearly)
Emotion (the ability to create or control emotion in your listeners)
Character (the ability to convey integrity and goodwill)

Modern concepts
In the British education system, gravitas was seen as one of the pillars of the moral formation of the English gentleman during the Victorian and Edwardian eras. It is partly derived from the notion of aristocratic pedigree, indicating polish, grace in manner as well as dignity in outward appearance. The British Empire also derived from the moral concept of imperium so that gravitas and other Roman virtues were idealized in its imperial society and in the governance of its dominion. India, for instance, was ruled by men whose sense of power were imbued with Roman virtues.  The concept of imperium also dominated the colonial Civil Service. The United Kingdom House of Commons also uses the term "bottom", which is the Conservative code for gravitas.

Gravitas is also used in communication, particularly in speech, where it denotes the use of emphasis in order to give certain words weight. Self-monitoring questions can determine expressive behavior and affective display, which could translate to gravitas in the way one conducts oneself or speaks. Self-monitoring questions can include, to ask ourselves: am I staying neutral, hindering direction or am I helping to contribute with my participation?

See also

 
  – also known as bona fides in Latin

References

External links 
 

Latin words and phrases
Ancient Roman virtues